John Edgar Goldingay (born 20 June 1942 in Birmingham, United Kingdom) is a British Old Testament scholar and translator and Anglican cleric. He is the David Allan Hubbard Professor Emeritus of Old Testament in the School of Theology of Fuller Theological Seminary in California.

Education and Career 
Goldingay obtained a Bachelor of Arts (BA) at the University of Oxford and a Doctor of Philosophy (PhD) at the University of Nottingham. He also has a Doctor of Divinity Lambeth degree. He was ordained a deacon in the Church of England in 1966 and a priest in 1967.

Goldingay was a Professor of Old Testament and Hebrew at St John's College, Nottingham and served as Principal from 1988 to 1997. He went to Fuller Theological Seminary in 1997. He was also an associate priest at St Barnabas Episcopal Church, Pasadena.

Personal life 
Goldingay was married to his first wife, Ann, for 43 years until she died in June 2009. In 2010 he married Kathleen Scott. He has two adult sons from his first marriage and an adult step-daughter from the second. After retiring from Fuller, he moved back to his home country of England in the spring of 2018, living in Oxford.

Writing career
Goldingay has published major commentaries on several books of the Old Testament as well as books on Old Testament theology and biblical interpretation. From 2010 to 2016, he issued the Old Testament for Everyone series through Westminster John Knox Press, a study guide for laypeople with original translation and study notes for each book of the Protestant Old Testament canon. In 2018, his complete translation of the Old Testament was released by InterVarsity Press under the title The First Testament.

Selected works

Books

Articles

References
GOLDINGAY, Rev. Prof. John Edgar, Who's Who 2015, A & C Black, 2015; online edn, Oxford University Press, 2014

British biblical scholars
Living people
1942 births
People from Birmingham, West Midlands
Fuller Theological Seminary faculty
Alumni of Keble College, Oxford
Alumni of the University of Nottingham
Old Testament scholars
Bible commentators
Evangelical Anglican biblical scholars
Staff of St John's College, Nottingham